William Lawlor may refer to:

 William P. Lawlor (1854–1926), justice of the California Supreme Court from 1915 to 1926
 William B. Lawlor (fl. 1872–1880), educator and member of the Los Angeles Common Council

See also
William Lawler (disambiguation)